Olpin is a surname. Notable people with the surname include:

A. Ray Olpin (1898–1983), American university president
Robert S. Olpin (1940–2005), American art historian, professor, and author

See also
Olin (name)
Joseph Olpin House